The 2018–19 season was Queen of the South's Centenary season and was also the club's sixth consecutive season back in the second tier of Scottish football and their sixth season in the Scottish Championship, having been promoted as champions from the Scottish Second Division at the end of the 2012–13 season. Queens also competed in the Scottish Cup, the League Cup, and the Challenge Cup.

Summary
Queens finished ninth in the Scottish Championship and their league position qualified the club for the semi final stage of the play-offs, where the played Montrose and progressed 6–2 on aggregate. Queens won the play-off final 3–1 on aggregate versus Raith Rovers. 

Queens reached the third round of the Challenge Cup, losing 2–0 away to East Fife.

Queens reached the second round of the League Cup, losing 4–2 after extra time at Palmerston to St Johnstone.

Queens reached the fifth round of the Scottish Cup, losing 4–1 to Aberdeen at Pittodrie.

Results and fixtures

Pre season

Scottish Championship

Championship play-offs

Scottish Challenge Cup

Scottish League Cup

Scottish Cup

Player statistics

Captains

|-

|-

Squad 
Last updated 18 May 2019 

|}
a.  Includes other competitive competitions, including the play-offs and the Challenge Cup.

Disciplinary record

Top scorers
Last updated 18 May 2019

Clean sheets
{| class="wikitable" style="font-size: 95%; text-align: center;"
|-
!width=15|
!width=15|
!width=15|
!width=150|Name
!width=80|Scottish Championship
!width=80|Other
!width=80|League Cup
!width=80|Scottish Cup
!width=80|Total
|-
|1
|GK
|
|Alan Martin
|9
|2
|2
|1
|14
|-
|13
|GK
|
|Deniz Mehmet
|0
|0
|0
|0
|0
|-
|20
|GK
|
|Jack Leighfield
|0
|1
|0
|0
|1
|-
|
|
|
! Totals !! 9 !! 3 !! 2 !! 1 !! 15

Team statistics

League table

League Cup table

Division summary

Management statistics
Last updated 18 May 2019

Transfers

Players in

Players out

See also
List of Queen of the South F.C. seasons

Notes

References

Queen of the South F.C. seasons
Queen of the South